Toni Niemi (born March 14, 1985) is a Finnish ice hockey defenceman.

Niemi made his SM-liiga debut playing with Ilves during the 2004–05 SM-liiga season.

References

External links

1985 births
Living people
Finnish ice hockey defencemen
Ilves players
Lahti Pelicans players